Batocera breuningi is a species of beetle in the family Cerambycidae. It was described by Gilmour and Dibb in 1948. It is known from Tonkin. It is a rare species which could be possibly threatened in later years.

References

Batocerini
Beetles described in 1948